Poliopastea eacus is a moth of the subfamily Arctiinae. It was described by Caspar Stoll in 1781. It is found in Suriname and Pará, Brazil.

References

Poliopastea
Moths described in 1781